Zimbabwe competed at the 2013 World Aquatics Championships in Barcelona, Spain between 19 July and 4 August.

Swimming

Zimbabwean swimmers achieved qualifying standards in the following events (up to a maximum of 2 swimmers in each event at the A-standard entry time, and 1 at the B-standard):

Men

References

External links
 Barcelona 2013 Official Site
 Zimbabwe Aquatics Union

Nations at the 2013 World Aquatics Championships
2013
World Aquatics Championships